José Figueroa may refer to:

Sports
 José Manuel Figueroa (weightlifter) (born 1939), Puerto Rican weightlifter
 José Figueroa (footballer) (born 1958), Honduran footballer
 José Figueroa (judoka) (born 1970), Puerto Rican judoka
 Jose Ricardo Figueroa (born 1991), Cuban modern pentathlete
 Tito Figueroa (José Antonio Figueroa, born 1914), Puerto Rican baseball player

Others
 José Figueroa (1792–1835), Mexican general and territorial governor of Alta California
 José Angel Figueroa (born 1946), Puerto Rican poet
 José Rubén Figueroa Smutny (born 1967), Mexican politician
 José Manuel Figueroa (born 1975), American musician
 José Figueroa, surviving passenger of Avianca Flight 52 in 1990

Other uses
 Jose Figueroa deportation case